Palm Pictures is a US-based entertainment company owned and run by Chris Blackwell. Palm Pictures produces, acquires and distributes music and film projects with a particular focus on the DVD-Video format. Palm places an emphasis on such projects as music documentaries, arthouse, foreign cinema and music videos. Palm Pictures' entertainment properties include a film division, a music label, sputnik7.com, epitonic.com, Arthouse Films and RES Media Group, publisher of RES magazine.

Palm Pictures has its own customised content channel on Audiotube.

Film titles 
Films distributed by Palm Pictures include:

See also Directors Label.

Music artists
Artists released/distributed by Palm Pictures include:

See also
 List of record labels
 List of jungle and drum n bass record labels

External links
 – official site

American record labels
Drum and bass record labels
Film distributors of the United States
World music record labels